Eurybela is a genus of moths of the family Crambidae.

Species
Eurybela scotopis Turner, 1908
Eurybela trophoessa (Turner, 1908)

References

Spilomelinae
Crambidae genera
Taxa named by Alfred Jefferis Turner